Dolgaš is a village in the municipality of Centar Župa, North Macedonia.

Demographics
The village is inhabited by a Turkish speaking population consisting of Turks.

According to the 2002 census, the village had a total of 123 inhabitants. Ethnic groups in the village include:

Turks 123

References

Villages in Centar Župa Municipality
Turkish communities in North Macedonia